Hoppet may refer to:
 Hoppet (film) - a 2007 Swedish film directed by Petter Næss
 Hoppet, Haninge Municipality - an urban area on the island of Muskö, Haninge Municipality, Stockholm County, Sweden
 Kangaroo Hoppet - a long-distance cross-country skiing race held in Falls Creek, Victoria, Australia
 Leva på 'Hoppet' - a 1951 Swedish comedy film directed by Göran Gentele
 Op Hoop van Zegen - a 1900 Dutch play by Herman Heijermans, performed under the title Hoppet in some countries